Escamoles (from azcatl 'ant' and molli 'puree'), known colloquially as Mexican caviar or insect caviar, are the edible larvae and pupae of ants of the species Liometopum apiculatum and L. occidentale var. luctuosum. They are most commonly consumed in Mexico City and surrounding areas. Escamoles have been consumed in Mexico since the age of the  Aztecs. The taste is described as buttery and nutty, with a texture akin to that of cottage cheese.

See also
Chahuis — the edible beetles of Mexico
Entomophagy in humans — the human consumption of insects as food
 List of delicacies

References

External links
Club 700 Hoy video on the harvest of escamoles (in Spanish)
 (Several recipes for escamoles.)

Ants
Insects as food
Insects of Mexico
Mexican cuisine